Béla Farkas (born 10 December 1928) is a Hungarian boxer. He competed at the 1948 Summer Olympics and the 1952 Summer Olympics.

References

External links
 

1928 births
Possibly living people
Hungarian male boxers
Olympic boxers of Hungary
Boxers at the 1948 Summer Olympics
Boxers at the 1952 Summer Olympics
People from Komárom
Featherweight boxers
Sportspeople from Komárom-Esztergom County
20th-century Hungarian people